Allied Wireless Communications Corporation (AWCC), doing business as Alltel Wireless, was a wireless telecommunications provider serving customers in six states. AWCC customers were transferred to AT&T Mobility in 2015 and the Alltel brand was officially retired in 2016

Formation of AWCC

On April 26, 2010, ATN acquired certain former Alltel wireless assets that Verizon Wireless was required to divest as part of the regulatory approvals granted for its purchase of Alltel earlier that year. Since that time, ATN, through the AWCC subsidiary, has served subscribers primarily in rural areas across Georgia, North Carolina, South Carolina, Illinois, Ohio, and Idaho.

On September 20, 2013 AWCC was acquired from ATN by AT&T, Inc. (NYSE: T).

See also 
Alltel Wireless

References

External links
 Allied Wireless (subsidiary of AT&T Mobility)
 Alltel Wireless

Mobile phone companies of the United States